The 1981–82 NCAA Division II men's ice hockey season began in November 1981 and concluded on March 20 of the following year. This was the 18th season of second-tier college ice hockey.

Boston State began merging with Massachusetts–Boston in September 1981. Because of this Boston State did not field a team for the 1981–82 season though they were still considered members of ECAC 2. After the merger was completed Massachusetts–Boston promoted their program from Division III to Division II beginning with the 1982–83 season.

Regular season

Season tournaments

Standings

1982 NCAA Tournament

Note: * denotes overtime period(s)

See also
 1981–82 NCAA Division I men's ice hockey season
 1981–82 NCAA Division III men's ice hockey season

References

External links

 
NCAA